Karma Thinley Rinpoche ཀརྨ་འཕྲིན་ལས་རིན་པོ་ཆེ་  (born 1931), is an important master of the Kagyu Mahamudra, Sakya Lamdré  and Chod traditions of Tibetan Buddhism active in the west and Nepal. He is also well regarded by Tibetans as a scholar, poet and artist.

Life

Karma Thinley Rinpoche was born in Nangchen, Kham, in Qinghai in 1931. At age two, he was recognized as a reincarnation of Beru Shaiyak Lama Kunrik.

Throughout the 1950s, Rinpoche made pilgrimages to Radeng, Samye, Sakya and Lhasa. Eventually, he settled for a period at Tsurphu Monastery, traditional seat of the Karmapa. The 16th Karmapa recognized Rinpoche as a tulku of Karma Thinleypa.

Karma Thinley Rinpoche left Tibet for India in 1959 and during the 1960s was abbot of the Young Lamas Home School and Karma Drubgyu Thargay Ling nunnery both founded by Freda Bedi in Dalhousie, HP. There he was one of the first Tibetan refugee Lamas to teach western students. In 1971 he accompanied a group of Tibetan refugees resettled in Ontario, Canada as their Lama and in 1973 established a Buddhist center, Kampo Gangra Drubgyud Ling meditation centre in Toronto, Ontario, Canada.

In 1982, Karma Tinley Rinpoche was able to visit his homeland Nangchen for the first time since leaving a quarter of a century earlier. Returning several times since then he has established a temple in Shorda, capital of Nangchen District and a school for nomad children in the Sangshung valley.

In 1988, he also established a nunnery, Tekchen Lekshay Ling, at Boudhanath Nepal and subsequently a small meditation retreat center at Pharping.

His students include Lama Jampa Thaye, a British Buddhist teacher who is Karma Thinley Rinpoche's dharma-regent and founded the Dechen sangha, and the Nepalese Lama, Rana Guru.

Bibliography
 Karma Thinley. History of 16 Karmapas. Shambhala (2001)  
 Karma Thinley Rinpoche. The Telescope of Wisdom. Ganesha Press (2009)

References

External links
 P00KG09735 karma phrin las - TBRC
 Karma Trinley Rinpoche - Rangjung Yeshi Wiki
 Profiles of Tibetan Buddhists - Buddhanet
 Vajra Acharya Lama Karma Thinley Rinpoche - Buddhanet
 Karma Thinley Rinpoche - KGDL

People from Kham
Sakya lamas
Karma Kagyu lamas
Lamas from Tibet
20th-century lamas
1931 births
Living people